Tom James Hoskins (13 March 1864 – 16 July 1934) was an English-born Australian politician.

He was born at Stratton-on-the-Fosse in Somerset to master mason William Hoskins and Sophia, née Carter. While a young man he arrived in New South Wales and worked as a wheelwright, eventually establishing a coachbuilding business at Dulwich Hill. He married Annie McConnell, with whom he had six children. From 1903 to 1917 he was an alderman at Petersham, serving as mayor from 1910 to 1912 and from 1915 to 1916. He was also involved in the Royal Agricultural Society from 1901 to 1934, serving as vice-president from 1918 to 1934. In 1913 he was elected to the New South Wales Legislative Assembly as the Liberal member for Dulwich Hill. During the period of proportional representation from 1920 to 1927 he was one of the members for Western Suburbs but he was not able to get preselection for a safe seat in 1927, standing unsuccessfully as an Independent Nationalist. He had served as party whip from 1917 to 1921. Hoskins died in 1934 at Marrickville.

References

 

1864 births
1934 deaths
Nationalist Party of Australia members of the Parliament of New South Wales
Members of the New South Wales Legislative Assembly
People from Somerset
Mayors of Petersham